Pablo Andrés Illanes Tapia (born March 12, 1973) is a Chilean writer, screenwriter, journalist and film director, principally known as the creator of various successful telenovelas, including , , Alguien te mira, ¿Dónde está Elisa? and Conde Vrolok.

Biography 
Illanes studied journalism at Diego Portales University. After establishing himself as a film critic in Wikén, the weekend supplement of the newspaper El Mercurio, and at the defunct TV station , he wrote his first telenovela, Adrenalina (1996). It was aired on Canal 13. The telenovela generated controversy for its storyline based on fleeting teen romances at a high school in the "barrio alto" (upper district) of Santiago.

His second telenovela,  (1997), was the most watched telenovela of the decade on its channel.

After  (2001), a series which obtained weak ratings and critical reviews and caused a temporary pause of telenovela production on Canal 13, he reestablished himself with the successful Machos (2003), co-written with Coca Gómez and Sebastián Arrau. The telenovela had a broad social impact and generated substantial ratings, and won several awards including two Altazors. It was extremely successful and would eventually be rebroadcast in Spain and various Latin American countries including Uruguay, where it was greatly popular.

He also adapted the script of the Argentinean soap opera Floricienta, whose Chilean version, Floribella, premiered in 2006. Illanes created the first Chilean suspense TV series, Alguien te mira, based on the activities of a psychopath in the affluent section of Santiago, gaining the largest ever audience for a nighttime television series. After that series, he wrote Conde Vrolok, a vampire telenovela set in the 19th century and inspired by Dracula.

, Illanes is working on a third novel, Los Amantes Caníbales, named after his blog.
 
Illanes directed  (2011), a horror film starring actresses such as Ingrid Isensee, Claudia Burr, Francisca Merina, Sofía García, and Patricia López from several of his previous series. He filmed his second feature-length film, Videoclub, in late 2012.

Illanes became a screenwriter with Telemundo in 2013, and is contracted to the company for three years. More recently, he signed a deal with Viacom International Studios.

Personal life 
As of 2018, Illanes is married to director Mauricio López. Their announcement received praise from Chilean LGBT rights-focused organization MOVILH.

Filmography

Film
 Baby Shower (2011)
 Video cub (2013)
 No tengas miedo (2014)
 Sala de ensayo (2015)

Television 
 Adrenalina (Canal 13, 1996)
 Playa salvaje (Canal 13, 1997)
 Fuera de control (Canal 13, 1999)
 Piel canela (Canal 13, 2001)
 Machos (Canal 13, 2003)
 Destinos cruzados (TVN, 2004)
 Versus (TVN, 2005)
 Floribella, adaptación (TVN, 2006)
 Alguien te mira (TVN, 2007)
 ¿Dónde está Elisa? (TVN, 2009)
 Conde Vrolok (TVN, 2009-2010)
 Témpano (TVN, 2011)
 Prófugos, (HBO, 2011)
 Reserva de familia, adaptación (TVN, 2012)

 Publications 
 Una mujer brutal, novel, Alfaguara, 2000
 Te vas a morir de pena cuando yo no esté, a play premiered under the direction of Ricardo Balil, January 23, 2012 in the 
 mp3, stories; publisher, Editorial Andrés Bello, 2003 
 fragilidad, novel, Alfaguara, 2004
 Los amantes caníbales'', novel, Planeta, 2015

References 
 Translated from Pablo Illanes' Spanish Wikipedia by the collaborative work of the Duolingo community.

External links 

 Los Amantes Caníbales, personal blog on gore cinema
 
 Illanes on Alfaguara

1973 births
Living people
Chilean journalists
Male journalists
Chilean male writers
Chilean LGBT journalists
Chilean LGBT screenwriters
Chilean gay writers
Gay screenwriters
People from Santiago
Telenovela writers
Male television writers